Michael R. Gibbons is a former Republican member of the Missouri Senate, representing the 15th District from 2001 to 2009. He served as President pro tempore. Previously he was a member of the Missouri House of Representatives from 1993 through 2000. In 2008 he ran for Missouri Attorney General, losing to the Democratic nominee Chris Koster.

He is a graduate of Westminster College, Missouri and of the Saint Louis University School of Law. He has held a number of public leadership positions, including Deputy Mayor of Kirkwood, Minority Caucus Chair and Assistant Floor Leader of the Missouri House of Representatives, and Chair of the Ways and Means Committee and Majority Floor Leader in the Missouri State Senate.

He resides in Kirkwood, Missouri, and is an active Episcopalian. He married Elizabeth Weddell in 1988, and they have two children, Danny and Meredith.

References 
Official Manual, State of Missouri, 2005-2006. Jefferson City, MO: Secretary of State.

External links 
Michael Gibbons for Attorney General official campaign website
Missouri Senate - Michael Gibbons official government website
Project Vote Smart - Michael R. Gibbons profile
Follow the Money - Michael R Gibbons
2006 2004 2000 1998 1996 campaign contributions

1959 births
Living people
People from Kirkwood, Missouri
Republican Party Missouri state senators
Republican Party members of the Missouri House of Representatives
Saint Louis University alumni
Westminster College (Missouri) alumni
American Episcopalians